Matthias Bleyer (born 1 August 1969) is a former footballer who played as a forward.

External links
 

1969 births
Living people
Austrian footballers
SC Eisenstadt players
Wiener Sport-Club players
SK Rapid Wien players
First Vienna FC players
FC Braunau players
FC Linz players
SKN St. Pölten players
SW Bregenz players
BSV Bad Bleiberg players
SC Schwanenstadt players
Association football forwards